The three NUTS (Nomenclature of Territorial Units for Statistics) levels for Latvia (LV) are:

NUTS codes
LV0 Latvia
LV00 Latvia
LV003 Kurzeme
LV005 Latgale
LV006 Rīga
LV007 Pierīga
LV008 Vidzeme
LV009 Zemgale

Local administrative units

NUTS 3 level is subdivided into LAU 1 units. LAU 1 units are subdivided into LAU 2 units.

LAU (Local Administrative Units) in Latvia according to NUTS regulation (up to 31.12.2011):

History of changes of LAU 2 codes till 1 July 2009 can be viewed  here.

LAU in Latvia according to NUTS regulation (starting 01.01.2012):

* Due to Administrative Territorial Reform (1 July 2009) administrative districts no longer exist as administrative units in Latvia. Municipalities and parishes amalgamated and formed new LAU 2 units – municipalities. LAU 2 codes from 1 July 2009 updated version.

Changes of LAU 2 codes on 1 July 2009 can be viewed  here

See also
 Subdivisions of Latvia
 ISO 3166-2 codes of Latvia
 FIPS region codes of Latvia

Sources
 Hierarchical list of the Nomenclature of territorial units for statistics - NUTS and the Statistical regions of Europe
 Correspondence between the NUTS levels and the local administrative units of each EU country
 List of current NUTS codes
 Download current NUTS codes (ODS format)
 Municipalities of Latvia, Statoids.com

Latvia
Nuts
Reform in Latvia